William Franklin Atwood was an American professional baseball player. He played in Major League Baseball (MLB) as a catcher for the Philadelphia Phillies from 1936 to 1940.

Atwood was born in Rome, Georgia on September 25, 1911. He attended college at Hardin-Simmons University. In 342 career games between 1936 and 1940, Atwood had 220 hits in 961 at bats. He died on September 14, 1993, after a car accident in Snyder, Texas.

References

External links
Baseball Reference

1911 births
1993 deaths
Philadelphia Phillies players
Major League Baseball catchers
Baseball players from Georgia (U.S. state)
Minor league baseball managers
Dallas Steers players
Birmingham Barons players
Hartford Senators players
Baltimore Orioles (IL) players
Johnstown Johnnies players
Jersey City Skeeters players
Hollywood Stars players
Sherman–Denison Twins players
Hardin–Simmons Cowboys baseball players
Road incident deaths in Texas